The Way Home is the fourth studio album by Christian singer-songwriter Russ Taff, released in 1989 on Myrrh Records. Music videos were made for "Winds of Change" and "I Cry" to promote the album. The Way Home was ranked at number 11 on CCM Magazines 100 Greatest Albums in Christian Music. The album includes a one-minute version of the traditional gospel song "Ain't No Grave" – Taff later recorded a longer version on his 1991 album Under Their Influence. In 1990, The Way Home won Rock Album of the Year and the song "The River Unbroken" won Rock Recorded Song of the Year at the 21st GMA Dove Awards. Taff was also nominated for Best Gospel Performance, Male for the song "Farther On" at the 32nd Grammy Awards. The album topped the Billboard Inspirational Albums chart.

Track listing

 Personnel 
 Russ Taff – vocals, guitars, backing vocals (1, 3, 5, 6, 8, 10, 11, 12), guitar solo (6)
 Larry Hall – keyboards 
 James Hollihan – keyboards, melodica, guitars, backing vocals (4, 7, 10, 11, 12), guitar solo (7, 12)
 Chuck Leavell – keyboards (8, 10, 11), acoustic piano solo (8)
 John Darnall – mandolin (1)
 Jackie Street – bass 
 Lynn Williams – drums 
 Terry McMillan – percussion (2-11), harmonica (9)
 Mark Douthit – saxophones (5)
 Mike Haynes – trumpet (5)
 The Real JR Strings – strings (6, 12)
 Don Hart – string arrangements (6, 12)
 Ashley Cleveland – additional vocals (2, 8, 10, 11)
 Greg Sparks – backing vocals (4, 11)
 Rebecca Ed Sparks – backing vocals (4, 6, 7, 10, 11), additional vocals (12)
 Marshall Chapman – backing vocals (8)
 Frank Ådhal – backing vocals (10, 11, 12)
 Bonnie Keen – backing vocals (10)
 Dan Keen – backing vocals (10, 11)
 Marty McCall – backing vocals (10, 11)
 Darrell Brown – backing vocals (11)Production Russ Taff – producer 
 James Hollihan Jr.  – producer 
 Tim Crich – engineer 
 Peter Coleman – mixing at Mama Jo's Studio (North Hollywood, California)
 Lynn Fuston – additional engineer 
 David Garcia – additional engineer 
 David Schober – additional engineer
 Elaine Anderson – assistant engineer 
 Shawn McLean – assistant engineer
 Gil Morales – assistant engineer 
 Chris Rich – assistant engineer 
 Clarke Schleicher – assistant engineer 
 Mac Smith – assistant engineer 
 Dan Hersch – mastering at DigiPrep (Hollywood, California)
 Buddy Jackson – art direction 
 Laurie Fink – cover coordinator 
 Bonnie Schiffman – black and white photography 
 Loren Balman – front cover photography 
 Zack Glickman – management

 Charts 

Radio singles

AccoladesGMA Dove Awards'

References

1989 albums
Russ Taff albums
Myrrh Records albums